Giuseppe "Bepi" Colombo (October 2, 1920 in Padua – February 20, 1984 in Padua) was an Italian scientist, mathematician and engineer at the University of Padua, Italy.

Mercury 

Colombo studied the planet Mercury, and it was his calculations which showed how to get a spacecraft into a solar orbit which would encounter Mercury multiple times, using a gravity assist maneuver with Venus. Due to this idea, NASA was able to have the Mariner 10 accomplish three fly-bys of Mercury instead of one. Mariner 10 was the first  spacecraft to use gravity assist. Since then, the technique has become common.

Colombo also explained the spin-orbit resonance in Mercury's orbit, showing that it rotates three times for every two orbits around the sun.

Saturn's rings 

Colombo also made significant contributions to the study of Saturn's rings, mostly using ground-based observations in the era before space exploration reached the outer solar system.

Other contributions 

 Colombo invented the concept of tethers for tying satellites together. 
 Colombo participated in the planning of Giotto, the European Space Agency's mission to Halley's Comet, but died before the spacecraft was launched.

Legacy 
 The Giuseppe Colombo Centre for Space Geodesy in Matera, Italy.
 ESA awards a 'Colombo fellowship' each year to a European scientist working in the field of astronautics

Several astronomical objects and spaceships are named after to honor him:
 The ESA-JAXA mission to Mercury, which launched at 1:45:28 UTC on 20 October 2018, is named BepiColombo.
 The Colombo Gap in Saturn's rings.
 The asteroid 10387 Bepicolombo

References

External links 
 Biography from the University of Padua

Academic staff of the University of Padua
1920 births
1984 deaths
20th-century Italian engineers
20th-century Italian mathematicians